Yodo1, Ltd. is a Chinese mobile game publisher based in Beijing. Founded in November 2011, it is headed by co-founders Henry Fong and James LaLonde as chief executive officer and chief growth officer, respectively, and publishes games with a focus on the Chinese market. As of October 2019, games published by Yodo1 have been played by one billion users.

History 
Yodo1 was founded in November 2011 by a group of video game entrepreneurs. Founders include chief executive officer Henry Fong and chief growth officer James LaLonde. In a June 2012 round of seed funding led by Chang You Fund managing partner Zhi Tan, Yodo1 raised  from Chang You Fund. In June and August 2012, Yodo1 partnered with Robot Entertainment and HandyGames, respectively, to release their games in China.

References

External links 
 

2011 establishments in China
Video game companies established in 2011
Video game companies of China
Video game publishers